Buffalo Bill's Last Fight is a 1927 MGM silent fictionalized film short in two-color Technicolor. It was the second short film produced as part of Metro-Goldwyn-Mayer's "Great Events" series. As with the first film in the series, The Flag: A Story Inspired by the Tradition of Betsy Ross, this film continued the series' original intent to focus on events from American history. Ultimately, only one other short (The Heart of General Robert E. Lee) was shot which stuck to this format; the other films in the series featured historical events with a European or Asian focus.

Production
The film was shot at the Tec-Art Studio in Hollywood and at the Arapahoe Indian Reservation in Riverton, Wyoming.

References

External links 

1927 films
American silent short films
Metro-Goldwyn-Mayer short films
Silent films in color
1920s American films